Vitjazinella multicostata is a species of sea snail, a marine gastropod mollusk in the family Raphitomidae.

Description
The length of the shell attains 7.2 mm.

Distribution
This marine species was found in the Izu–Bonin Trench, Northwest Pacific

References

 Sysoev, AV. "Ultra-abyssal Findings of Mollusks of the Family Turridae (Gastropoda, Toxoglossa) in the Pacific Ocean" Zoologichesky Zhurnal 67.7 (1988): 965–973.

External links
  Tucker, J.K. 2004 Catalog of recent and fossil turrids (Mollusca: Gastropoda). Zootaxa 682:1-1295.
 Worldwide Mollusc Species Data Base: Vitjazinella multicostata
 Abdelkrim J., Aznar-Cormano L., Fedosov A., Kantor Y., Lozouet P., Phuong M., Zaharias P. & Puillandre N. (2018). Exon-capture based phylogeny and diversification of the venomous gastropods (Neogastropoda, Conoidea). Molecular Biology and Evolution. 35(10): 2355-2374

multicostata
Gastropods described in 1988